The Greenland Handball Federation (GHF) is the governing body of handball and beach handball in Greenland. GHF was founded on 11 May 1974, joined International Handball Federation in 1998 and Pan-American Team Handball Federation. GHF is also affiliated with the Sports Confederation of Greenland. It is based in Nuuk.

Competitions
 Greenlandic Men's Handball Championship
 Greenlandic Women's Handball Championship

National teams
 Greenland men's national handball team
 Greenland women's national handball team

References

External links
Official website 
Greenland Handball Federation at IHF site
Greenland Handball Federation at PATHF site 

Sports organisations of Greenland
Handball in Greenland
1974 establishments in Greenland
Sports organizations established in 1974
Handball governing bodies
North America and Caribbean Handball Confederation members